Annona foetida  is a species of plant in the family Annonaceae. It is native to Bolivia, Brazil, Colombia, French Guiana, Peru and Suriname. Carl Friedrich Philipp von Martius, the German botanist who first formally described the species, named it after its foul-smelling ( in Latin) odor.

Description
It is a shrub or a tree reaching 3.3-3.9 meters in height. Its dark gray-brown bark is tough and flexible. Its leaves  are 10.8-21.6 by 4.1-8.1 centimeters and come to an abrupt point at their tips. Its petioles are 6.8 millimeters long.  Its fruit are reddish-brown and the size of a goose egg. Its seeds are flat, yellowish, ovals, 9 millimeters in length. Its bark and unripe fruit have a remarkably foul odor.

Reproductive biology
The pollen of Annona foetida is shed as permanent tetrads. It is pollinated by the scarab beetle Cyciocephala undata.

Habitat and distribution
It grows in forest habitats.  Its fruit mature in December.

Uses
Bioactive compounds extracted from leaves, bark and branches have been reported to have antimicrobial, antileishmanial and antitrypanosomal activities.

References

External links
 

foetida
Flora of Bolivia
Flora of Brazil
Flora of Colombia
Flora of French Guiana
Flora of Peru
Flora of Suriname
Plants described in 1841
Taxa named by Carl Friedrich Philipp von Martius